Biot is a French surname. It may refer to

 Camille Biot (1850–1918), French physician
 Charlie Biot (1917–2000), American Negro League baseball player
 Édouard Biot (1803–1850), French engineer and sinologist
 Jacques Biot (born 1952), French engineer, businessman and academic administrator
 Jean-Baptiste Biot (1774–1862), French physicist and mathematician
 Maurice Anthony Biot (1905–1985), Belgian-American physicist